Jovana Jakšić was the defending champion, but lost in the first round to Bianca Andreescu.

Catherine Bellis won the title, defeating Andreescu 6–4, 6–2 in the final.

Seeds

Draw

Finals

Top half

Bottom half

References
Main Draw

Challenger Banque Nationale de Saguenay
Challenger de Saguenay